Galbusera is a vintage brand of Italian motorcycles made by Moto Galbusera & Co. (later Motocicli Plinio Galbusera) in Brescia from 1934 to 1955.

History
Plinio Galbusera and engineer Adolf Marama Toyo initially built 173 to 498 cc Python (Rudge-Whitworth) - and Sturmey-Archer engines into their frames, but in 1938 they made two larger models. One was a 249.2 cc four-two with compressor; the other had a 498.4 cc eight cylinder engine built from two coupled four blocks. It also had a compressor.

Galbusera did not intend to develop much power. His primary goal was to create reliable machines and the top speed of 150 km / hour was very acceptable.

After 1945, the standard engine was 125 to 175 cc with two-Sachs-blocks, later replaced by Villiers engines. In 1955 they began to have financial problems and production was terminated.

See also

List of Italian companies
List of motorcycle manufacturers

References

Motorcycles by brand
Defunct motor vehicle manufacturers of Italy
Defunct motorcycle manufacturers of Italy